The Hundred of Wandearah is a cadastral unit of hundred in South Australia. It is one of the 14 hundreds of the County of Victoria and was proclaimed by Governor Anthony Musgrave in December 1874. The hundred lacks any townships and is split into the bounded of localities of Wandearah West and Wandearah East. According to South Australian historians Rodney Cockburn and Geoffrey Manning, it was named for an indigenous term meaning "big trees".

See also 
 Lands administrative divisions of South Australia

References 

Wandearah
1874 establishments in Australia